The 1992 Yonex All England Open was the 82nd edition of the All England Open Badminton Championships. It was held from March 11 to March 15, 1992, in London, England.

It was a five-star tournament and the prize money was US$125,000.

Venue
Wembley Arena

Final results

Men's singles

Section 1

Section 2

Women's singles

Section 1

Section 2

External links
Smash: 1992 All England Open

All England Open Badminton Championships
All England Open
All England
All England Open Badminton Championships in London
All England Open Badminton Championships
All England Open Badminton Championships